Walter Odington was a 14th-century English Benedictine scientific and especially musical theory author. He is also known as Walter of Evesham, by some writers confounded with Walter of Eynsham, who lived about fifty years earlier, died not earlier than 1330.

During the first part of his religious life he was stationed at Evesham and later removed to Oxford, where he was engaged in astronomical and mathematical work as early as 1316.

Writings
He wrote chiefly on scientific subjects. His work De Speculatione Musices was first published in complete form in Edmond de Coussemaker's Scriptores; other works are in manuscript only. In this treatise, a remarkable work written at Evesham and therefore certainly before 1316, according to Riemann before 1300, the author gathered together practically all the knowledge of the theory of music possessed at his time and added some theoretical considerations of his own. Of particular note is his suggestion that, in practice, musicians often favour simple, just tuning of imperfect consonances, such as the major third, over the traditionally held Pythagorean tuning, which was the predominant theoretical framework.  For example, Odington writes:Verumtamen quia vicinae sunt sesquiquartae et sesquiquintae habitudinibus...iccirco plurimos estimant consonas esse. Et si in numeris non reperiantur consoni, voces tamen hominum sua subtilitate ipsos ducunt in mixturam suavem... (Nevertheless, on account of their [the Pythagorean tunings of the major and minor thirds] being neighbours to 5:4 and 6:5...very many people therefore deem them to be consonances. And if they are not found to be consonant in number, human voices, by their own subtlety, nevertheless lead themselves into pleasant mixture...).A discussion of his work is given by Riemann, who claims for him the distinction of having, before the close of the thirteenth century, established on theoretical grounds the consonance of minor and major thirds.
 
Davey enumerates the following works:
"De Speculatione Musices"; "Ycocedron", a treatise on alchemy
"Declaratio motus octavæ spheræ"
"Tractatus de multiplicatione specierum in visu secundum omnem modum"
"Ars metrica Walteri de Evesham"
"Liber quintus geometriæ per numeros loco quantitatum"
"Calendar for Evesham Abbey".

References

English Benedictines
13th-century births
14th-century deaths
English music theorists
Medieval music theorists